The Nymphalidae are the largest family of butterflies, with more than 6,000 species distributed throughout most of the world. Belonging to the superfamily Papilionoidea, they are usually medium-sized to large butterflies. Most species have a reduced pair of forelegs and many hold their colourful wings flat when resting. They are also called brush-footed butterflies or four-footed butterflies, because they are known to stand on only four legs while the other two are curled up; in some species, these forelegs have a brush-like set of hairs, which gives this family its other common name. Many species are brightly coloured and include popular species such as the emperors, monarch butterfly, admirals, tortoiseshells, and fritillaries. However, the under wings are, in contrast, often dull and in some species look remarkably like dead leaves, or are much paler, producing a cryptic effect that helps the butterflies blend into their surroundings.

Nomenclature 

Rafinesque introduced the name Nymphalia as a subfamily name in diurnal Lepidoptera. Rafinesque did not include Nymphalis among the listed genera, but Nymphalis was unequivocally implied in the formation of the name (Code Article 11.7.1.1). The attribution of the Nymphalidae to Rafinesque has now been widely adopted.

Classification 

In the adult butterflies, the first pair of legs is small or reduced, giving the family the other names of four-footed or brush-footed butterflies. The caterpillars are hairy or spiky with projections on the head, and the chrysalids have shiny spots.

The forewings have the submedial vein (vein 1) unbranched and in one subfamily forked near the base; the medial vein has three branches, veins 2, 3, and 4; veins 5 and 6 arise from the points of junction of the discocellulars; the subcostal vein and its continuation beyond the apex of cell, vein 7, has never more than four branches, veins 8–11; 8 and 9 always arise from vein 7, 10, and 11 sometimes from vein 7 but more often free, i.e., given off by the subcostal vein before apex of the cell.

The hindwings have internal (1a) and precostal veins. The cell in both wings is closed or open, often closed in the fore, open in the hindwing. The dorsal margin of the hindwing is channelled to receive the abdomen in many of the forms.

The antennae always have two grooves on the underside; the club is variable in shape. Throughout the family, the front pair of legs in the male, and with three exceptions (Libythea, Pseudergolis, and Calinaga) in the female also, is reduced in size and functionally impotent; in some, the atrophy of the forelegs is considerable, e.g., the Danainae and Satyrinae. In many of the forms of these subfamilies, the forelegs are kept pressed against the underside of the thorax, and are in the male often very inconspicuous.

Systematics and phylogeny 

The phylogeny of the Nymphalidae is complex. Several taxa are of unclear position, reflecting the fact that some subfamilies were formerly well-recognized as distinct families due to insufficient study.

The five main clades within the family are:

The libytheine clade (basal)

 Libytheinae (snout butterflies, earlier treated as the distinct family Libytheidae)

The danaine clade (basal)

 Danainae (milkweed butterflies, earlier treated as the distinct family Danaidae)
 Host plant families include Apocynaceae, Asclepiadoideae (subfamily of Apocynaceae), and Moraceae.
 Ithomiini (about 300 Neotropical species, sometimes considered a subfamily Ithomiinae)
 Most species have long wings, and some have transparent wings. Host plants are in the families Apocynaceae, Gesneriaceae, and Solanaceae.
 Tellervini (about 6–10 species in Australasia, sometimes considered a subfamily Tellervinae)
 Caterpillars resemble those of the Danainae and feed on Apocynaceae.

The satyrine clade

 Calinaginae (about six species, restricted to the Himalayas)
 Mimics of the Danainae, they are restricted to host plants in the family Moraceae.
 Charaxinae
 Tropical canopy butterflies, the caterpillars often have head spines or projections. Mostly edible species, have some Batesian mimics. Host plants are in the families Annonaceae, Celastraceae, Convolvulaceae, Euphorbiaceae, Fabaceae, Flacourtiaceae, Lauraceae, Myrtaceae, Piperaceae, Poaceae, Rhamnaceae, Rutaceae, Santalaceae, and Sapindaceae.
 Morphinae (including Amathusiini, sometimes considered a subfamily Amathusiinae)
 Include the spectacular neotropical Morpho, its food plants include the Arecaceae, Bignoniaceae, Fabaceae, Menispermaceae, Poaceae, and Sapindaceae.
 Brassolini (owls, neotropical with 70–80 species, mostly crepuscular, sometimes considered a subfamily Brassolinae)
 Host plants in the families Arecaceae, Bromeliaceae, Heliconiaceae, Musaceae, and Poaceae.
 Satyrinae (satyrs and browns, earlier treated as distinct family Satyridae)
 Host plants are in the families Arecaceae, Araceae, Cyperaceae, Heliconiaceae, Poaceae, and Selaginellaceae.

The heliconiine clade (sister group of the nymphaline clade, excludes former tribes Biblidini and Cyrestini, and tribes Pseudergolini and Coeini)

 Heliconiinae (earlier treated as distinct family Heliconiidae)
 Colourful tropical butterflies, they are noted for Müllerian mimicry. All species use host plants in the family Passifloraceae.
 Acraeini (mostly African, but some species in Asia, sometimes considered a family Acraeinae)
 Host plants are in the families Asteraceae, Passifloraceae, Sterculiaceae, Tiliaceae, and Urticaceae.
 Limenitidinae

The nymphaline clade (sister group of the heliconiine clade, also includes tribes Coeini and Pseudergolini)

 Apaturinae (mostly tropical)
 Host plants are in the family Ulmaceae. Caterpillars are smooth with bifid tails and horns on the head.
 Biblidinae (formerly in Limenitidinae)
 Cyrestinae (formerly in Limenitidinae)
 Nymphalinae (a large subfamily that sometimes includes the Limenitidinae and Biblidinae)
 Some species migrate. Caterpillars are sometimes covered in spines. Host plants include Acanthaceae, Caprifoliaceae, Convolvulaceae, Euphorbiaceae, Fagaceae, Flacourtiaceae, Lamiaceae, Loranthaceae, Moraceae, Plantaginaceae, Poaceae, Rubiaceae, Rutaceae, Salicaceae, Sapindaceae, Scrophulariaceae, Urticaceae, and Verbenaceae.

Example species from this family 

 Archdukes, genus Lexias
 California tortoiseshell, Nymphalis californica
 Comma, Polygonia c-album
 Common buckeye, Junonia coenia
 Common snout butterfly, Libytheana carinenta
 Cracker butterflies, genus Hamadryas
 Crimson patch, Chlosyne janais
 Edith's checkerspot, Euphydryas editha
 Grayling (butterfly), Hipparchia semele
 Hackberry emperor, Asterocampa celtis
 Lorquin's admiral, Limenitis lorquini
 Marsh fritillary, Euphydryas aurinia
 Meadow brown, Maniola jurtina
 Mourning cloak, Nymphalis antiopa
 Monarch butterfly, Danaus plexippus
 Blue morpho, Morpho menelaus
 Painted lady, Vanessa cardui
 Peacock, Aglais io
 Plain tiger, Danaus chrysippus
 Question mark, Polygonia interrogationis
 Red admiral, Vanessa atalanta
 Small heath, Coenonympha pamphilus
 Small tortoiseshell, Nymphalis urticae
 Gatekeeper, Pyronia tithonus
 Small pearl-bordered fritillary, Boloria selene
 Andromeda satyr, Cithaerias andromeda
 Texan crescentspot butterfly, Anthanassa texana texana

Morphology

The trait for which these butterflies are most known is the use of only four legs; the reason their forelegs have become vestigial is not yet completely clear. Some suggest the forelegs are used to amplify the sense of smell, because some species possess a brush-like set of soft hair called setae, which has led researchers to believe the forelegs are used to improve signaling and communication between the species, while standing in the other four. This ability proves useful in terms of reproduction and the overall health of the species, and it is the leading theory so far.

See also

List of fritillaries (butterflies)

References

Further reading 

 Glassberg, Jeffrey Butterflies through Binoculars, The West (2001)
 Guppy, Crispin S. and Shepard, Jon H. Butterflies of British Columbia (2001)
 James, David G. and Nunnallee, David Life Histories of Cascadia Butterflies (2011)
 Pelham, Jonathan Catalogue of the Butterflies of the United States and Canada (2008)
 Pyle, Robert Michael The Butterflies of Cascadia (2002)

External links 

 Canadian Biodiversity Information Facility (2003): Family Nymphalidae
 Nymphalidae "Family Nymphalidae". Insecta.pro.
 Peter Chew: Danaids and Browns - Family Nymphalidae, Brisbane butterflies web site (2005).
 Tree of Life Web Project: Nymphalidae
 Nymphalidae from all over the world

 
Butterfly families
Taxa named by Constantine Samuel Rafinesque
Papilionoidea